Johan Georg Harmenberg (born 8 September 1954 in Stockholm, Sweden) is a Swedish Olympic and world champion epee fencer.

Early and personal life
Harmenberg was born in Stockholm, Sweden. He completed two years of study at the Massachusetts Institute of Technology (MIT) in 1975, leaving his course early (he would have graduated in 1977) before returning to Sweden, having been drafted by the Swedish army. He became a biotech executive and researcher. He now holds an MD and a PhD in virology from Karolinska Institute, Stockholm, Sweden, and has been the Chief Medical Officer of Oncopeptides AB since 2012. In September 2019, Harmenberg joined Beactica Therapeutics, a Swedish drug discovery company, as a clinical advisor.

His son Karl Harmenberg fenced epee for Harvard University, and as a junior in 2008-09 won the gold medal at the NCAA Regionals and was selected to All-Ivy League second team.

Fencing career
He has won eight total epee gold medals in both individual and team competitions at Olympic, World Championships, and World Cup tournaments.

World Championships
He won the World Championship titles in Individual Épée and Team Épée events at the 1977 competitions in Buenos Aires.

He also won a bronze medal in Team Épée at the 1979 World Championships in Hamburg.

World Cups
Harmenberg captured three Individual Épée World Cup Championships within four years: 1977 (Bern), 1979 (Heidenheim), and 1980 (Heidenheim). He also won team titles at the 1977 and 1980 World Cups.

Olympics
At the 1980 Moscow Olympic Games, he won a gold medal in the Individual Épée. In three of the final matches he won by only one touch. He is the only Swede to have won an individual gold medal in fencing. Harmenberg was a member of the Swedish épée team as well; the team placed 5th in the team épée competition.

Scholarship

He is the author of over 100 publications in scientific literature. Harmenberg co-authored scientific papers entitled "Fencing: Biomedical and Psychological Factors," "Comparison of different tests of fencing performance" (1991), and "Physiological and morphological characteristics of world class fencers" (1990).

Harmenberg has since had a distinguished career in medical pharmacology, publishing a variety of papers relating to viral immunology. After stints as VP of pharmaceutical development at Medivir, Chief Medical officer at Algeta ASA, is currently (2014) Medical Director and VP of clinical development at Axelar AB  in Stockholm, Sweden.

Johan co-authored Épée 2.0: The Birth of the New Fencing Paradigm, and Épée 2.5: The New Paradigm Revised and Augmented. In these books, he describes the new fencing paradigm that he developed with Maestro Eric Sollee, from MIT, which resulted in his victories and a transformation in how Épée is fenced at the higher levels of competition.

References

External links
 
 
 "Johan Harmenberg 50 år"

1954 births
Living people
Swedish male épée fencers
Olympic fencers of Sweden
Fencers at the 1980 Summer Olympics
Olympic gold medalists for Sweden
Olympic medalists in fencing
Massachusetts Institute of Technology alumni
Medalists at the 1980 Summer Olympics
Karolinska Institute alumni
Sportspeople from Stockholm
20th-century Swedish people